Illaenus tauricornis is a species of trilobites from Russia and Morocco, from the middle Ordovician.

Etymology
The Latin species name tauricornis means "bull-horned", with reference to the shape of the genal spines.

Description
These trilobites are without glabella and without articulation of the tail. The cephalon has a high profile and recurved genal spines. Eyes are distant from the axis of the head, situated nearer to the edge. Usually the cephalon is contracted, due to the contraction of the muscles during the fossilization.

References

External links

 American Museum of Natural History
 Fossil ID

Ordovician trilobites
Illaenina